Republic of Austria v. Altmann, 541 U.S. 677 (2004), was a case in which the Supreme Court of the United States held that the Foreign Sovereign Immunities Act, or FSIA, applies retroactively.  It is one of the most recent cases that deals with the "anti-retroactivity doctrine", which is a doctrine that holds that courts should not construe a statute to apply retroactively (to apply to situations that arose before it was enacted) unless there is a clear statutory intent that it should do so. This means that, regarding lawsuits filed after its enactment, the FSIA standards of sovereign immunity and its exceptions apply even to conduct that took place before 1976. Since the FSIA is only a codification of existing well settled international law, Austria was deemed not immune from litigation.

The result of this case for the plaintiff, Maria Altmann, was that she was authorized to proceed with a civil action against Austria in a U.S. federal district court for recovery of five paintings stolen by the Nazis from her relatives and then housed in an Austrian government museum.  As the Supreme Court noted in its decision, Altmann had already tried suing the museum before in Austria, but was forced to voluntarily dismiss her case because of Austria's rule that court costs are proportional to the amount in controversy (in this case, the enormous monetary value of the paintings).  Under Austrian law, the filing fee for such a lawsuit is determined as a percentage of the recoverable amount. At the time, the five paintings were estimated to be worth approximately US$135 million, making the filing fee over US$1.5 million. Although the Austrian courts later reduced this amount to $350,000, this was still too much for Altmann, and she dropped her case in the Austrian court system.  

The high court remanded the case for trial in the Los Angeles district court.  Back in the district court, both parties agreed to arbitration in Austria in 2005, which in turn ruled in favor of Altmann on 16 January 2006.

Case
Adele Bloch-Bauer, the subject of two of the paintings, had written in her last will: "Meine 2 Porträts und 4 Landschaften von Gustav Klimt, bitte ich meinen Ehegatten nach seinem Tode der österr. Staats-Galerie in Wien zu hinterlassen"; that is, "I ask my husband to bequeath my 2 portraits and the 4 landscapes by Gustav Klimt to the Austrian State Gallery in Vienna after his death." Ferdinand Bloch-Bauer signed a statement acknowledging Adele's wish in her last will. He also donated one of the paintings to the Belvedere Gallery in Vienna in 1936. The Austrian Supreme Court determined that Adele was probably never the legal owner of the paintings. Rather, it viewed it as more likely that Ferdinand Bloch-Bauer was their legal owner and that in turn Altmann was the rightful heir of Ferdinand's estate.

Aftermath

Reactions and auction 

The ruling in favor of Maria Altmann came as a great shock to the Austrian public and the government. The loss of the paintings was regarded in Austria as a loss of national treasure. She had attempted earlier to come to some mutual agreement in 1999; however, the government repeatedly ignored her proposals. Maria Altmann told the government that the time was up and there would be no deal from her side anymore. The Austrian government declined to accept a condition of the arbitration which would have allowed it preferentially to purchase the paintings at an attested market price. The paintings left Austria in March 2006 and were returned to Altmann.  Consequently, the Austrian government received criticism from the opposition parties for its failure to secure a deal with Altmann at an earlier stage.  The city of Vienna also asserted that repossessing the paintings was a "moral duty".

Just months after the Austrian government finally returned Ms. Altmann's family's heirlooms to her, she consigned the Klimts to the auction house Christie's, to be sold on her behalf. Portrait of Adele Bloch-Bauer I sold for allegedly $135 million in a private sale, the others in auction, e.g. Portrait of Adele Bloch-Bauer II for $88 million, with the five paintings fetching a total of over $327 million.

Gallery of the Klimts

Documentaries 
Maria Altmann's story has been recounted in three documentary films. Stealing Klimt, which was released in 2007, featured interviews with Altmann and others who were closely involved with the story. Adele's Wish by filmmaker Terrence Turner, who is the husband of Altmann's great-niece, was released in 2008, and features interviews with Altmann, her lawyer, E. Randol Schoenberg, and leading experts from around the world. The piece was also featured in the 2006 documentary The Rape of Europa, which dealt with the massive theft of art in Europe by the Nazi Government during World War II.

Dramatization 

Altmann is portrayed by Helen Mirren, and Schoenberg by Ryan Reynolds in the film Woman in Gold, chronicling Altmann's nearly decade-long struggle to recover the Klimt paintings. The film was released on April 3, 2015.

See also
 List of United States Supreme Court cases, volume 541
 Art repatriation
 National Fund of the Republic of Austria for Victims of National Socialism
 Alperin v. Vatican Bank
 Woman in Gold (film)

References

Sources
.

External links
 
 Adele's Wish  Documentary film on the Republic of Austria v. Altmann court case
 National Fund of the Republic of Austria for Victims of National Socialism
 Institute for the History of Jews in Austria
 Holocaust Victims' Information and Support Center
 Republic of Austria | Historikerkommission

2004 in United States case law
United States Constitution Article Three case law
United States Supreme Court cases
United States Supreme Court cases of the Rehnquist Court
Foreign Sovereign Immunity Act case law
Austria–United States relations
Art and cultural repatriation after World War II